CentraState Healthcare System is a non-for-profit community health organization consisting of an acute-care hospital, an ambulatory care campus, three senior living communities, a Family Medicine Residency Program, and a charitable foundation.

Established in 1971, CentraState Healthcare System consists of the Main Medical Center, three senior living communities, an ambulatory campus, a wellness & fitness center, and a family medicine center. The Main Medical Center building has 287 beds.

On October 22, 2020, officials from Atlantic Health System announced that they were acquiring a 51% stake in Freehold based CentraState Healthcare System. As a part of the deal, CentraState will continue to govern themselves while Atlantic Health System has committed to invest $135 million into the hospital.

References

External links

Hospital buildings completed in 1971
Hospitals in Monmouth County, New Jersey
Hospitals in New Jersey
Hospitals established in 1971
Freehold Township, New Jersey